Craft Ventures is a venture capital firm based in San Francisco which makes early stage venture investments. Craft was founded in 2017 by David O. Sacks and Bill Lee.

Background
Craft was founded in 2017 by David O. Sacks, formerly of Yammer and PayPal and Bill Lee, formerly of Remarq and Big Fish Games. Jeff Fluhr, founder and former CEO of StubHub, joined as general partner in 2018 and Sky Dayton, founder of EarthLink and Boingo Wireless, joined as venture partner the same year.

Craft announced its first fund of $350 million in January 2018 and its second fund of $500M in October 2019.

Funds
Craft Ventures I ($350 million) was raised in 2017.

Craft Ventures II ($500 million) was raised in 2019.

In August 2021, Craft announced the closing of Craft Ventures III ($612 million) and Craft Ventures Growth I ($510 million), focusing on SaaS businesses and marketplace businesses.

Notable Exits

References 

Financial services companies established in 2017
Venture capital firms of the United States
2017 establishments in California